Lusine Tovmasyan (born July 25, 1986) is an Armenian beauty pageant contestant who won the title of Miss Armenia 2003.

Biography 
Tovmasyan was born to Armenian parents in Yerevan, where she spent her childhood. She was accepted to the University of Philology and became a student at the Russian-Armenian state university.

She participated in the competition Miss Armenia when she was 17, although she would go on to become the first runner-up at Miss Europe 2005, to Shermine Sharivar.

See also 
 Miss Armenia

References

External links
 

1986 births
Living people
Armenian beauty pageant winners
Models from Yerevan